Sergio Lorenzo "Serge" Pizzorno (born 15 December 1980) is a British guitarist, singer and songwriter, best known for his work with the rock band Kasabian. He is Kasabian's primary songwriter since the departure of co-composer Christopher Karloff in 2006, and also the band's co-lead singer, and later being the sole lead singer following the 2020 sacking of Tom Meighan. He is also a member of Loose Tapestries alongside Noel Fielding and fellow Kasabian member Tim Carter, a group put together to produce music for Fielding's TV series Noel Fielding's Luxury Comedy.

Biography 
Pizzorno's paternal grandfather emigrated from Genoa, Italy, to England and settled in Leicester. Despite being brought up in the city, Pizzorno was born in Newton Abbot, Devon because his mother liked the hospital. He originally had intentions to start a career in football, and said that "I told my careers adviser I wanted to be centre forward for Leicester City". He also supports Genoa CFC, as his uncle Gianni, born in Genoa, took him to the Luigi Ferraris Stadium when he was a child.

Kasabian 
Pizzorno is not fond of Kasabian being compared to similar, older bands, including Oasis and The Stone Roses. He says "The foreign fans listen to the music more and don't call us The Stone Roses or anything. I think they get us for who we are, especially in France and places like that. There's no baggage like in the UK." Pizzorno has also expressed admiration for Damon Albarn, the frontman of Oasis' rival Britpop band Blur.

Despite this, Pizzorno is an admirer of Oasis, in particular former lead guitarist Noel Gallagher. He has said that "at our school, if you played guitar you got beat up for being a ponce. Then Oasis came along and suddenly playing guitar was cool. They inspired a whole generation of bands. When we started out as kids, it was Noel Gallagher who inspired me more than any teacher or historical figure I'd heard about." "For Oasis to ask us to go with them is an honour and a pleasure. I imagine they see a lot of themselves in us and I don't imagine they'd go on tour with a band they didn't like."

Kasabian are consistently referred to as an indie rock band, but, Pizzorno has said "We've never been an indie band, you know, and I sort of fucking hate indie bands." He has referred to the band's music as "future rock".

Following Pizzorno's decision to become the band's frontman after parting ways with Tom Meighan, he prepared for the role by studying his favorite artists such as Tyler, the Creator, Iggy Pop, Björk, PJ Harvey, Liam Howlett and Liam Gallagher.

Other work 
Pizzorno has also worked with former Kasabian lead guitarist and songwriter Chris Karloff on the DJ Shadow track "The Tiger" from the album The Outsider. He notably scored a fabulous volley in the "Road to Wembley" segment on Soccer AM.

Pizzorno was at Wembley Stadium in November 2010 to make the draw for the FA Cup Third Round Proper, along with former Oasis guitarist and good friend Noel Gallagher.

In 2010, he composed the music for the movie London Boulevard, starring Colin Farrell, Ray Winstone and Keira Knightley.

In 2011, Pizzorno joined forces with friend Noel Fielding to create music for his new E4 sketch show Noel Fielding's Luxury Comedy. They formed a project called Loose Tapestries. Together, they also wrote the music for the second series of the show, which aired in 2014.

Pizzorno was one of the celebrities to take part in the 2012 edition of Soccer Aid, a charity football match played by celebrities and ex-footballers, on 27 May. He played for the Rest of the World team against England and scored the opening goal of the game, lobbing former England international goalkeeper David Seaman from a tight angle. Although the Rest of the World went on to lose 3–1, Pizzorno won the Man of the Match award.

He also appears on the album Beyond Ugly by Bristol band Malachai.

In May 2019, Pizzorno launched a solo project under the name The S.L.P.; his first single was called "Favourites" and it featured British rapper Little Simz.

Pizzorno is listed as an Executive producer on the film Walk Like A Panther (2018)

Personal life 
Pizzorno has described suffering symptoms suggestive of Synaesthesia; specifically how seeing magician's equipment on television would cause him to experience foul odours to the extent that they would trigger his gag reflex and cause him to lose his appetite.

Equipment 
Pizzorno has played a red Rickenbacker 481 guitar in nearly all of Kasabian's music videos (excluding the video for "Switchblade Smiles"), and nearly all their live performances. He also uses another rare guitar, a red 1966 Fender Coronado II with a golden pickguard, notable for unique guitar sound from their 2009 single "Underdog" despite the Rickenbacker 481 being shown in the music video. The Fender Coronado is used for their live performances of the song. The Fender Coronado is also used during live performances of their 2009 song "Where Did All the Love Go?".

Pizzorno's guitars include:
FireGlo Rickenbacker 481
JetGlo Rickenbacker 481
MapleGlo Rickenbacker 480
Red 1966 Fender Coronado II
Vox Ultrasonic
Epiphone Casino (resprayed with matte black finish)
White Vox teardrop (resprayed with matte black finish)
Mick Johnson Vox Teardrop
A matte black Fender Jazzmaster
Vox semi acoustic
Gibson ES-335
Gibson J-160e acoustic
Gibson Hummingbird
Gibson J-200
1950s Höfner Senator
Zemaitis GZA200-SUN-NT

Discography 

With Kasabian
 Kasabian (2004)
 Empire (2006)
 West Ryder Pauper Lunatic Asylum (2009)
 Velociraptor! (2011)
 48:13 (2014)
 For Crying Out Loud (2017)
 The Alchemist's Euphoria (2022)

With Loose Tapestries
 Loose Tapestries Presents the Luxury Comedy Tapes (2012) – production, various instruments
 N.H.S. (2015)

With The S.L.P.
  The S.L.P. (2019)

References 

Italian British musicians
English people of Italian descent
English rock guitarists
1980 births
Living people
People from Newton Abbot
People from Leicester
Kasabian members
Musicians from Leicestershire
Musicians from Devon